The 1937 Upper Iowa Peacocks football team was an American football team that represented Upper Iowa University as a member of the Iowa Conference during the 1937 college football season.

The team played its home games on Dorman Field in Fayette, Iowa.

Schedule

References

Upper Iowa Peacocks
Upper Iowa Peacocks football seasons
Upper Iowa Peacocks football
College football undefeated seasons